Pasay City West High School is a large public school in Pasay, Philippines, established in 1949.  It is located at Pasadeña Street, F.B. Harrison, Pasay.

Teachers and Administrators

 Peter R. Cannon Jr. - Principal IV
 Maria Garde Cleofe - Assistant School Principal
 Ivy A. Tanglao - Assistant School Principal

Admin
 Flexive O. Fontejon - Admin Officer II
 Rosalinda A. Pereña - Registrar I
 Analyn C. Asirot - Administrative Assistant II, SHS
 Alma Latayan - Administrative Asst. II - SHS
 Mylene N. Cabanatan - Administrative Clerk, JHS
 Regina S. San Juan - Administrative Clerk
 Exekiel M. Bacaycay - Senior Bookeeper
 Gladys B. Calatayud - Disbursing Officer
 Filipina A. De Guzman - School Nurse - JHS
 Anna C. Luciano - School Nurse - SHS
 Edeser V. Manzareno - Admin Aide I
 Rizalino M. Baral - Admin Aide I
 Eddie M. Adora - Admin Aide I
 Lovejoy O. Barcarse - Admin Aide I
 Joel B. Ngoho - Admin Aide I
 Fernando J. Nollora - Driver I

Filipino Department
 Bettina D. Amiscaray - Department Head VI
 Juanito C. Atienza - Master Teacher II
 Imelda E. Onte - Master Teacher II
 Ditas M. Landingin - Master Teacher I
 Ma. Teressa B. Nicolas - Teacher III
 Ma. Corazon A. Apelacio - Teacher II
 Algani R. Beceril - Teacher II
 Jhon Robert H. Blas - Teacher II
 Laarni Queen C. Britanico - Teacher II
 Evangeline G. Manalang - Teacher II
 Elena T. Tianzon - Teacher II
 Mary Cris B. Bacani - Teacher I
 Ira Mae D. Bucago - Teacher I
 Loreta J. Gonzaga - Teacher I
 Sheena F. Gregana - Teacher I
 Ricky T. Majaris - Teacher I
 Jennifer L. Parajas - Teacher I
 Pearlhet Angelique Tubale - Teacher I

English Department
 Veronica D. Miranda - Department Head VI
 Antonella M. Aragon - Maser Teacher II
 Celia L. Singcol - Master Teacher II
 Annabelle B. Genito - Teacher III
 Myrna T. Pantoja - Teacher III
 Cynthia L. Abrquez - Teacher III
 Reynaldo O. Baguio - Teacher II
 Jenelyn E. Bareng - Teacher III
 Teresita B. Censon - Teacher II
 Lilibeth A. Dela Rosa - Teacher II
 Grace R. Legarda - Teacher II
 Lolita O. Olarte - Teacher II
 Rosanna S. Vinarao - Teacher II
 Raquel May R. Basa - Teacher I
 Mico Ivan A. De Gala - Teacher I
 Kerstine P. Espenida - Teacher I
 Mary Ann P. Latupan - Teacher I
 Edgar A. Racca - Teacher I
 Judy C. Sutaron - Teacher I
 Charlotte Joy A. Tolop - Teacher I
 Lynzhee Star P. Yjan - Teacher I
 Dan G. Sajorda - Teacher I

Math Department
 Aracelie S. Serdaña - Department Head VI
 Ma. Gloria C. Castillo - Master Teacher II
 Digna B. De Leon - Master Teacher II
 Rica Joy D. Gloria - Master Teacher I
 Mary Ann A. Ariza - Teacher III
 Rizaldo C. Iscales - Teacher III
 Almeda C. Macaranas - Teacher III
 Mary Grace R. Ocasion - Teacher III
 Edelmira V. Racca - Teacher III
 Rowena F. Salvio - Teacher III
 Rosario S. Siva - Teacher III
 Ronald E. Batoon - Teacher II
 Marites F. Bontigao - Teacher II
 Myrna G. Engana - Teacher II
 Joel D. Gayrama - Teacher II
 Nicolas E. Bornillo - Teacher II
 Lilibeth T. Miralles - Teacher II
 Andrea S. Villegas - Teacher II
 Jose T. Barcia Jr. - Teacher I
 Orly C. Ching - Teacher I
 Jhon Francis G. Sembrero - Teacher I
 Jameson S. Suzara - Teacher I
 Alvin A. Tahup - Teacher I

Science Department
 Eva E. Sabarillo - Department Head III
 Maria Corazon C. Fuentes - Master Teacher II
 Rosalina H. Del Villar - Master Teacher I
 Herminia L. Balantakbo - Teacher III
 Hazel B. Enerio - Teacher III
 Janalin Fae T. Romblon - Teacher III
 Maria Cristina D. Singson - Teacher III
 Jaycent M. Bustos - Teacher II
 Sheryll P. Delos Puyos - Teacher II
 Marietta T. Diaz - Teacher II
 Ma. Luisa A. Guambao - Teacher II
 Ralph C. Malacad - Teacher II
 Editha F. Pilon - Teacher III
 Conception M. Quintana - Teacher III
 Ma. Cristina P. Valdez - Teacher III
 April E. Vale - Teacher II
 Jennifer D. Base - Teacher I
 Romee A. Darag - Teacher I
 Ma. Peñafrancia T. De Leon - Teacher I
 Ernie P. Gagarin Jr. - Teacher I
 Charisse F. Guerra - Teacher I
 Reymart A. Pucolangas - Teacher I
 Joji A. Uson - Teacher I

AP Department
 Socorro C. Domingo - Department Head VI
 Vivian C. Agulto - Master Teacher II
 Ma. Luisa V. Bautista - Teacher III
 Madelyn C. Buenaobra - Teacher III
 Arlene Joy T. Jacob - Teacher III
 Jhon Francis L. Octaviano - Teacher III
 Rowena A. Tablada - Teacher III
 Morena V. Peralta - Teacher III
 Susana C. Cunanan - Teacher II
 Piedad O. Diola - Teacher II
 Emmylou C. Gloriani - Teacher III
 Mitchelle James Lauron - Teacher II
 Rizza C. Cortez - Teacher II
 Jeanie A. Ebue - Teacher II
 Lilibeth M. Moico - Teacher II
 Irene A. Odosis - Teacher II
 Milton D. Mosquito - Teacher I
 Cyrus S. Magbojos - Teacher I
 Rex Jhon D. Sol - Teacher I

Values Department
 Rodolfo C. Del Rosario - OIC Department Head/Master Teacher II
 Rosy P. Buctuan - Teacher III
 Janice A. Bergonia - Teacher III
 Juliet P. Boncales - Teacher III
 Rosario V. Collado - Teacher III
 Cecile B. Espera - Teacher III
 Rommel L. Macatiag - Teacher III
 Richard M. Silvestre - Teacher III
 Antonio Villegas - Teacher III
 Hannah Ruth R. David - Teacher II
 Aileen S. Largosta - Teacher II
 Alma L. Ternora - Teacher II
 Gina G. Mendoza - Teacher I

TLE Department
 Mildred C. Romanban - OIC Department Head/Master Teacher II
 Jocelyn C. Chinchilla - Master Teacher I
 Berlie P. Rapiz - Master Teacher I
 Jenitha T. Origenes - Master Teacher I
 Hector P. Villareal - Master Teacher I
 Adoracion R. Bartolome - Teacher III
 Fria B. Canlas - Teacher III
 Nomer P. Lopez - Teacher III
 Teresita C. Pamplona - Teacher III
 Martin M. Pazziuagan Jr. - Teacher III
 Severino O. Sabarillo - Teacher III
 Pinky U. Apestol - Teacher II
 Merylex A. Deseo - Teacher II
 Juanita A. Flores - Teacher II
 Maria Victoria G. Ronan - Teacher II
 Bona Vanesa P. Atienza - Teacher I
 Roberto Querubin B. Bañez - Teacher I
 Agusto D. Buado - Teacher I
 Erna A. Diongco - Teacher I
 Gener E. Eugenio - Teacher I
 Ronald E. Guileño - Teacher I
 Adrean S. Magbojos - Teacher I
 Clarissa Irah Manansala - Teacher I
 Ma. Luisa M. Mansayon - Teacher I
 Thrina Mae M. Ramos - Teacher I
 King Alfred D. Sy - Teacher I

MAPEH Department
 Omar I. Aguilar - Department Head VI
 Adelina P. Limos - Master Teacher I
 Ireneo T. Macaspag - Master Teacher I
 Julieta H. Brioso - Teacher III
 Reynante S. Panlaqui - Teacher III
 Kharisma G. Sim - Teacher III
 Roberto L. Sandajan - Teacher III
 Esperanza R. Alban - Teacher II
 Luzminda M. Agpoon - Teacher II
 Evelyn N. Aguilar - Teacher II
 Marilou T. Bardaje - Teacher II
 Chrismarilene R. Cabataña - Teacher II
 Anjo Marl B. Luciano - Teacher II
 Ignacio S. Tolentino - Teacher II
 Marvin B. Ditalo - Teacher I
 Emanuele C. Garen - Teacher I
 Jerome N. Garñn - Teacher I
 Narcisa V. Lim - Teacher I
 Dave A. San Juan - Teacher I
 Glenda P. Villacortes - Teacher I

Senior High School
 Zenon R. Abao - Master Teacher II
 Mayorico C. Apelado Jr.  - Master Teacher II
 Joana Marie Carina M. Gabunilas - Master Teacher II
 Joan T. Espejo - Master Teacher II
 Venessa B. Infante - Master Teacher II
 Anthony Jhon Miles L. Garcia - Master Teacher II
 Ma. Teresa B. Flores - Master Teacher I
 Rosan P. Beboso - Teacher III
 Ma. Gina P. Bituaran - Teacher III
 Zeddy P. Boral - Teacher III
 Liezel G. Clemente - Teacher III
 Lorina Del Rosario - Teacher III
 Twinkle A. Galang - Teacher III
 Alex Ian A. Chavez - Teacher III
 Adrian G. Isidro - Teacher III
 Marites R. Marcelino - Teacher III
 Marife M. Magdato - Teacher III
 Jo Carlo C. Navidad - Teacher III
 Lovein S. Pagatpat - Teacher III
 Robelito D. Buac - Teacher II
 Shella Claire C. Cabicol - Teacher II
 Ahlee G. Genova - Teacher II
 Rene E. Gorgonia - Teacher II
 Jaimer C. Talatayod - Teacher II
 Mary Trisha A. Abedejos - Teacher I
 Aivy B. Bartolata - Teacher I
 Christian T. Basilan - Teacher I
 Krisha Mae C. Bucayu - Teacher I
 Mary Judith I. Cubio - Teacher I
 Roselyn M. Dela Peña - Teacher I
 Manilyn N. Dulin - Teacher I
 Daylyn C. Gomez - Teacher I
 Ronel A. Pauig - Teacher I
 Jan Bianca E. Santos - Teacher I
 Jessa Mae S. Tibon - Teacher I

Buildings 

 Building 1
This is the most important building of all. This building has occupied many departmental rooms such as the science department. You can also find the Library in this building and also the Principal's office. The Cashier office, the Record Center, Information Communication Technology Laboratory, E-Learning Center and the AVR (Audio Visual Room) can be found in this building.

 Building 2
This building is one of the largest buildings in Pasay West High School. The year level who occupies this building are the Juniors and the senior students of the latter school. First, the latter building was the largest building in the Pasay West High School, but not until the building had been separated into two: The building 3 and the building 2. The Values Department can now be found at building 2.

 Building 3
This building is like a dedication to the Science department because it is named after it. This building doesn't occupy any departmental rooms. It is only occupied by 4th year and 3rd year students. At the first floor of this building is the canteen. This Building is the newest building that has made in PCWHS this building is on PCWHS since 1949 but in the year 2004, it has been demolished because of its walls. The Pasay City West High School has started to renovate this building in the year 2005 and has been finished in the year 2007 but started to be occupied by students at the year 2008. The Filipino and Mathematics Department are now both located at building 3.

 Building 4
This building is dedicated to the former mayor of Pasay Atty. Pewee Trinidad. This Building has the size of 45 ft. in Pasay City West High School. Since 1949, this building has been use by various students. It was built in late 1990s. Since now, This Building is occupied by the DOST-ESEP (Engineering and Science Educational Program) students and top sections of the Regular Class. The Principal's Office, Records Center, Guidance Center & Science Faculty are located in the first floor of this building. At the building's second level, the 7- Edison, 7- Newton, Foreign language, Computer Lab rooms can be found. The third level serves as the dwelling place for the several grades 8, 9 & 10 rooms. This includes 9- Dalton, 8-Aristotle, 10- Galilei & 8- Mendel. In the fourth floor, the 7-Archimedes could be found beside 10- Einstein's room. While the Chemistry Laboratory is located beside 9- Lavoisier's room. DOST-ESEP students must maintain a grade of 85 and above for all academic subjects, otherwise they will be transferred to another school.

 Inside the building 4
This building were full of plants decorated by the HE Department in Pasay City West High School. This Building is occupied by the most departmental rooms such as the MAPEH Department.& HE (Home Economics) Department, but at the year 2008, The MAPEH Department has moved at the building 3. In 2015, as the building 1 was demolished, the English Department and the Social Studies Department was moved in building 3.

 The Gymnasium

The Pasay City West High School's Gymnasium is placed at the P.C.W.H.S center. The size of this building is 155 ft. (length) and 96 ft. (width) making it the widest occupied space in the school. It is where the Intramurals, Dance competition and some important events such as Mass are being held.
This also where the dance competition such as the modern dance and folk dance held. But only the graduation is held in this place because the Pasay City West High School graduation is always held at the Cuneta Astrodome.

Sections
Pasay City West High School have six grade levels and 138 sections in all 6 grade levels. 21 sections in grade 7, 27 sections in grade 8, 25 sections in grade 9, 23 sections in grade 10, 23 sections in grade 11, and 19 sections in grade 12.

GRADE 7
 Edison
 Newton
 Aster
 Cadena De Amor
 Carnation
 Daffodil
 Daisy
 Euphoria
 Freesia
 Gardenia
 Gerbera
 Ginger
 Gladiola
 Hyacinth
 Iris
 Jasmine
 Orchid
 Rose
 Sampaguita
 Sunflower
 Zinnia

GRADE 8
 Aristotle
 Mendel
 Maalalahanin
 Maamo
 Magalang
 Magiting
 Magiliw
 Makabayan
 Makakalikasan
 Makatao
 Malikhain
 Malinis
 Malumanay
 Mapagbigay
 Mapagpakumbaba
 Mapamaraan
 Mapayapa
 Marangal
 Marunong
 Masayahin
 Masigasig
 Masinop
 Matapat
 Matatag
 Matimpiin
 Matiyaga
 Mayumi

GRADE 9
 Dalton
 Layosier
 Acacia
 Aguho
 Anonas
 Apitong
 Bakawan
 Balite
 Banaba
 Caballero
 Cedar
 Dao
 Dapdap
 Higera
 Ipil
 Kakawate
 Kamagong
 Kanela
 Lanite
 Lauan
 Molave
 Narra
 Talisay
 Ulayan
 Yakal

GRADE 10
 Galilei
 Einstein
 Agoncillo
 Aquino
 Baltazar
 Bonifacio
 Burgos
 Dagohoy
 Del Pillar
 Gomez
 Jacinto
 Jaena
 Kudarat
 Lakandula
 Lapu-Lapu
 Luna
 Mabini
 Malvar
 Rajah-Sulayman
 Rizal
 Sakay
 Silang
 Zamora

GRADE 11
 Antares
 Aquarius
 Aries
 Betelgeuse
 Capricornus
 Cassiopeia
 Cygnus
 Gemini
 Hercules
 Leo
 Libra
 Orion
 Pegasus
 Perseus
 Pisces
 Pleiades
 Polaris
 Rigel
 Sagittarius
 Sirius
 Taurus
 Vega
 Virgo

GRADE 12
 Alexandrite
 Beryl
 Calcite
 Diamond
 Emerald
 Flourite
 Garnet
 Howlite
 Iolite
 Jadette
 Kyanite
 Lazulite
 Moonstone
 Nnephrite
 Onyx
 Pearl
 Quartz
 Ruby
 Sapphire

Gallery

External links 
 The directory to the Pasay City West High School Reunions " a website that contains some Pasay City West High School Students that plans for their reunion"
 Official website
 - official site of Pasay West Alumni Association
  - official Facebook page of Pasay West High School

High schools in Metro Manila
Schools in Pasay